Mauricio Ronald Soria Portillo (born 1 June 1966 in Cochabamba) is a Bolivian football manager and former player who played as a goalkeeper. He is the current manager of Guabirá.

Playing career
At club level, Soria played for Wilstermann, Destroyers, The Strongest, Bolívar and Aurora in his country.

Between 1990 and 2002, Soria capped for the Bolivia national team in 23 games. He was part of the squad in Copa America 1991, Copa America 1995 and Copa America 1997 when Bolivia finished as runners-up.

Managerial career
His debut as a manager occurred in July 2006, and it could not have been any better as Wilstermann won the 2006 Segundo Torneo league championship on December 3 of that year under his lead. During 2007 while managing Real Potosí, Soria won his second league title as he secured the 2007-Apertura for the lilas. He also had a short spell with the Bolivia national team as the manager participating in Copa America 2015 held in Chile. He was waived by the Bolivian Football Federation at the conclusion of the tournament and appointed Julio César Baldivieso in his place.

References

External links

1966 births
Living people
Sportspeople from Cochabamba
Association football goalkeepers
Bolivian footballers
Bolivian football managers
Club Bolívar players
The Strongest players
C.D. Jorge Wilstermann players
Club Destroyers players
Bolivia international footballers
1991 Copa América players
1995 Copa América players
1997 Copa América players
Club Real Potosí managers
C.D. Jorge Wilstermann managers
Club Blooming managers
The Strongest managers
Bolivia national football team managers
2015 Copa América managers
Club Always Ready players
Club Deportivo Guabirá managers